Liz Lerman (born 1947 in Los Angeles, CA) is an American dance choreographer and founder of Liz Lerman Dance Exchange .

Called by the Washington Post “the source of an epochal revolution in the scope and purposes of dance art,” she and her dancers have collaborated with shipbuilders, physicists, construction workers, and cancer researchers. In 2002 she won the MacArthur Genius Grant; in 2009, the Jack P. Blaney Award in Dialogue acknowledged her outstanding leadership, creativity, and dedication to melding dialogue with dance; and the 2017 Jacob’s Pillow Dance Award.

Early life 
Liz Lerman was born in Los Angeles, California on Christmas Day, 1947. Her father Philip was an organizer and activist, and her mother was an artist. Though her family moved several times when she was growing up, much of her early education was spent in Milwaukee, Wisconsin. When she was 14 years old, she danced in Washington, DC, for President Kennedy as part of a group from the National Music Camp in Interlochen, Michigan. She attended Bennington College, where she studied under Martha Wittman, who would later become a company member of Dance Exchange. She graduated received her B.A. in dance from the University of Maryland and an M.A. in dance from George Washington University.

Career
She founded the Liz Lerman Dance Exchange in 1976 and led the company's multi-generational ensemble until July 2011, when Lerman passed the leadership of her company to Cassie Meador; the company is now called simply Dance Exchange.
.

Under Lerman's leadership Dance Exchange appeared across the U.S. in locations as various as the National Cathedral, Kennedy Center Opera House, and Millennium Stage, Lansburgh Theatre, Clarice Smith Performing Arts Center, Harvard University, and the Museum of Contemporary Art, Chicago.

Lerman's early work was strongly associated with the inclusion of older people alongside more traditional young performers, and with the use of personal narrative. Her later-career work has focused on questions of science from genomics to high-energy physics to the physical and psychic wounds of war.

In January 2016 Lerman joined the Herberger Institute for Design and the Arts at Arizona State University in Tempe, Arizona as Institute Professor to lead programs and courses that span disciplines across ASU.

Liz-as-Toolmaker 
Lerman has a strong interest in generating, defining, iterating, and sharing the "tools" that result from her artistic processes. A “tool”, she describes could be a piece of information that is detached from other concepts and can be applied to many situations. These ideas also that the form of challenges or reminders to her artists, including “Rattle around in someone else’s universe”; “Turn discomfort into inquiry”; “Nothing is too small to notice”.

At Liz Lerman Dance Exchange, her tool sharing took the form of an online "Toolbox," with a later iteration called "D-Lab" that aimed to make certain tools widely accessible. Currently, Lerman is developing a new online platform, called The Atlas of Creative Tools, as the home for her existing and future tools.

Critical Response Process 
Lerman created the Critical Response Process, a method for giving and receiving feedback. Lerman developed the Process (known as CRP) in 1990 after realizing artists tended to apologize, rather than ask questions, when presenting unfinished work. The Process was formalized through the publication of the book "Critical Response Process: getting useful feedback on anything you make, from dance to dessert" in 2003 which Lerman wrote with co-author John Borstel.

Critical Response Process has a significant international presence, with institutional hosts including the Innovative Conservatoire, the Federation of Scottish Theatres, the London Sinfonietta, the Guildhall School of Music and Drama, and Yorkshire Dance in addition to US hosts such as the Yale School of Drama and the Tisch School for the Arts. CRP facilitator-cohorts are in development in Scotland  and in Baltimore, Maryland. In 2014 Yorkshire Dance developed a beta-version of an online-adaptation of CRP, called "respond."

In 2022, Wesleyan University Press will publish Lerman’s second book on CRP, called “Critique is Creative,” written with John Borstel and including essays by CRP practitioners from around the world.

Awards
 2017 Jacob's Pillow Dance Award
2015 American Dance Guild Lifetime Achievement Award
 2014 Dance/USA Honor Award
 2009 Jack P. Blaney Award for Dialogue

Choreography 
1974

 New York City Winter, St. Mark's Danspace, New York, NY
 Approaching Simone (choreography for a play by Megan Terry), Washington Area Feminist Theater, Washington D.C.
1975
 Women of the Clear Vision, Hand Chapel, Mount Vernon College, Washington D.C.
1976
 Memory Gardens, Washington Center for the Arts, Washington D.C.
1977
 Ms. Galaxy and Her Three Raps with God, Baltimore Theatre Project, Baltimore, MD
1978
 Elevator Operators and Other Strangers, Dance Exchange, Washington D.C
 Still Life with Cat and Fingers, Dance Exchange, Washington D.C.
 Goodbye Wisconsin, Dance Exchange, Washington D.C.
 Bonsai, National Arboretum, Washington D.C.
1979
 RSVP, O'Neill Choreographers' Conference, Waterford, CT
 Who's on First?, City Dance/Warner Theater, Washington D.C.
 Pollution Dances, McPhearson Square, Washington D.C
1980
 Fanfare for the Common Man, City Dance/National Mall, Washington D.C.
 Journey 1-4, Washington Project for the Arts, Washington D.C.
1981
 Current Events, Dance Place, Washington D.C.
 Songs and Poems in the Body: In the Gallery, Kennedy Center for the Performing Arts, Washington D.C.
1982
 Docudance: Reaganomics (No One Knows What the Numbers Mean), Dance Place, Washington D.C.
 Songs and Poems in the Body: In the Text, Dance Place, Washington D.C.
1983
 Docudance: Nine Short Dances About the Defense Budget and Other Military Matters, Marvin Center, George Washington University, Washington D.C.
 Variations on a Window, New Music America/Old Post Office Pavilion, Washington D.C.
 Pavane for Two Older Women, New Music America/Old Post Office Pavilion, Washington D.C.
1984
 Second Variation on a Window, Dance Place, Washington D.C.
 E. Hopper, Dance Place, Washington D.C.
 Ives & Company, National Portrait Gallery, Washington D.C.
 Space Cadet, Washington Project for the Arts, Washington D.C.
1985
 The Transparent Apple and the Silver Saucer, Sidwell Auditorium, Washington D.C.
1986
 Russia: Footnotes to a History, Museum of Contemporary Art, Los Angeles, CA
 Still Crossing, Liberty Dances in Battery Park, New York, NY
 Black Sea Follies, Lenox Arts Center, Lenox, MA
1987
 Atomic Priests: Coming Attractions, DAMA Theater, Washington D.C.
 Sketches from Memory, DAMA Theater, Washington D.C.
 Atomic Priests: The Feature, DAMA Theater Workshop, New York, NY
1988
 Ms. Appropriate Goes to the Theater, Dance Place, D.C.
1989
 Reenactments, Kennedy Center for the Performing Arts, Washington D.C.
 Floating Hand, Dance Place, Washington D.C.
 Five Days in Maine, Maine Festival, Portland, ME
1990
 May I Have Your Attention Please! Union Station, Washington D.C.
 Docudance 1990: Dark Interlude, 14th Street Danscenter, New York, NY
 The Perfect Ten, Serious Fun! at Lincoln Center, New York, NY
 A Life in the Nation's Capital, Dance Place, Washington D.C.
 Anatomy of an Inside Story, Dance Place, Washington D.C.
1991
 Short Stories (version 1), The Barns at Wolf Trap, Vienna, VA
 Short Stories (version 2), American Dance Festival, Durham, NC
 Untitled, Meredith College, Raleigh, NC
 The Good Jew? Israeli/Jewish American Dance Festival, Boston, MA
 Untitled (site-specific), Kennedy Center for the Performing Arts, Washington D.C.
1992
 The Awakening (collaboration with Kimberli Boyd), McKinley High School, Washington D.C.
1993
 Incidents in the Life of an Ohio Youth, BalletMet, Columbus, OH
 This Is Who We Are, Marvin Center, George Washington University, Washington D.C.
 Spelunking the Center (collaboration with Tom Truss), Kennedy Center for the Performing Arts, Washington D.C.
1994
 Safe House: Still Looking (theatrical version), Cowell Theater, San Francisco, CA
 Safe House: Still Looking (site-specific), Friends Meeting House, Wilmington, DE
1995
 Flying Into the Middle, Joyce Theater, New York, NY
 Shehechianu: Faith and Science on the Midway, Lansburg Theatre, Washington D.C.
 Room for Many More (collaboration with Kimberli Boyd), Chicago Historical Society, Chicago, IL
 Portsmouth Pages, Music Hall, Portsmouth, NH
1996
 Sustenance Dance (collaboration with Michelle Pearson), Mayfair Festival of the Arts, Allentown, PA
 The Music Hall's Shipyard Project, Music Hall/Portsmouth Naval Shipyard, Portsmouth, NE/Kittery/ME
 Shehechianu: Bench Marks, Lisner Auditorium, George Washington University, Washington D.C.
 Nocturnes, Lisner Auditorium, George Washington University, Washington D.C.
 Light Years, Intelsat Headquarters, Washington D.C.
 Fresh Blood, Queens Theatre in the Park, Washington D.C.
1997
 Shehechianu: Skin Soliloquies, Lansburgh Theater, Washington D.C.
1998
 Fifty Modest Reflections on Turning Fifty, Gammage Auditorium, Arizona State University, Tempe, AZ
 Pas de Dirt, Garde Arts Center, New London, CT
 White Gloves/Hard Hats, Garde Arts Center, New London, CT
 Moving to Hallelujah, Skirball Cultural Center, Los Angeles, CA
 Getting to Hallelujah, Garde Arts Center, New London, CT
1999
 Hallelujah: Gates of Praise, Lisner Auditorium, George Washington University, Washington D.C.
 Hallelujah: In Praise of Animals and Their People, George Washington University, Washington D.C.
2000
 Hallelujah: First Light, The dock, Eastport, ME
 Hallelujah: In Praise of Ordinary Prophets (collaboration with Peter DiMuro), University of Arizona, Tucson, AZ
 Hallelujah: In Praise of Fertile Fields (collaboration with Martha Wittman), Jacob's Pillow Dance Festival, Beckett, MA
2001
 Hallelujah: Stones Will Float, Leaves Will Sink, Paths Will Cross, Skirball Cultural Center, Los Angeles, CA
 Hallelujah: In Praise of Constancy in the Midst of Change, Flynn Center for the Performing Arts, Burlington, VT
 Hallelujah: In Praise of Beauty and Disorder, Walker Arts Center, Minneapolis, MN
 Hallelujah: In Praise of the Creative Spirit, Bates Dance Festival, Lewiston, ME
 Hallelujah: In Praise of Paradise Lost and Found, University Musical Society, Ann Arbor, MI
2002
 Uneasy Dances, Tampa Bay Performing Arts Center, Tampa, FL
 Dances at a Cocktail Party, Tampa Bay Performing Arts Center, Tampa, FL
 Hallelujah/USA, Clarice Smith Performing Arts Center, University of Maryland, College Park, MD
2003
 The Mad Dancers (play by Yehuda Hyman, co-directed and co-choreographed by Nick Olcott), Theatre J, Washington D.C.
2005
 Small Dances About Big Ideas, Harvard Law School, Cambridge, Massachusetts
2006
 Man/Chair Dances, Omaha Symphony Orchestra, Holland Performing Arts Center, Omaha, NE
 Ferocious Beauty: Genome, Wesleyan University, Middleton, CT
2007
 613 Radical Acts of Prayer (collaboration with Cassie Meador), New Jersey Performing Arts Center, Newark, NJ
2009
 Darwin's Wife, Center for Education and Culture, Sapporo, Japan
2010
 The Matter of Origins, Clarice Smith Performing Arts Center, University of Maryland, College Park, MD
2012
 Prelude to the Afternoon of a Fawn, Clarice Smith Performing Arts Center, University of Maryland, College Park, MD
2014
 Healing Wars, Arena Stage, Washington D.C.

Publications 
 Teaching Dance to Senior Adults, 1984
 Liz Lerman's Critical Response Process: A method for getting useful feedback on anything you make, from dance to dessert (co-author with John Borstel), 2003
 Hiking the Horizontal: Field Notes from a Choreographer, Wesleyan Press, 2011

References

External links

1948 births
Living people
American choreographers
MacArthur Fellows